The 2020 Challenge Cup, known as the Coral Challenge Cup for sponsorship reasons, was the 119th staging of the Challenge Cup, the main rugby league knockout tournament for teams in the Super League, the British national leagues and a number of invited amateur clubs.

The competition was won by Leeds Rhinos who beat Salford Red Devils 17–16 at Wembley Stadium on 17 October 2020.

Defending champions Warrington Wolves who won the 2019 title beating St Helens 18–4 at Wembley Stadium on 24 August 2019 were knocked out by Salford in the semi-finals.

The format of the competition remained as eight knock-out rounds followed by the final but the schedule was placed into disarray by the COVID-19 pandemic. The final was scheduled to be played on 18 July instead of the August bank holiday weekend. However on 16 March all rugby league games were suspended indefinitely, due to the COVID-19 pandemic in the United Kingdom.  The suspension was followed, on 19 May 2020, with confirmation from the Rugby Football League (RFL) of the postponement of the Challenge Cup Final, which had been scheduled for 18 July at Wembley Stadium.  The competition did not resume until 22 August with the final to be played on Saturday 17 October.

Entry
Entry into the Cup is mandatory for the English and Welsh professional teams, but is by invitation for all other clubs, either professional or amateur. French side Toulouse declined to enter for 2020, after also declining to play in previous years. Canadian side Toronto Wolfpack rejoined the competition after declining to play in the 2019 competition and by agreement would play all their matches in away from home.  Serbian club, Red Star who played in 2019 declined an invitation to enter in 2020 due to the demands the trip to England made on their players.

Effects of the COVID-19 pandemic

On 16 March 2020, the RFL announced that all rugby league games had been suspended initially, until at least April, due to the COVID-19 pandemic. However, on 24 March, rugby league clubs held a board meeting via conference call, attended in part by senior officials of the Rugby Football League, for further discussion of how to respond to the current public health crisis. It was agreed that until further notice, all rugby league fixtures would be suspended indefinitely.

The competition recommenced with the rescheduling of the sixth round on 22 August, after the RFL announced that rugby league could return from 2 August but with all games to be played behind closed doors. The pandemic caused Toronto Wolfpack to withdraw from the competition on 20 July, and just over a week later, on 28 July, the remaining Championship and League 1 clubs also withdrew from the competition. These withdrawals caused the RFL to reconsider the structure of the competition as only 10 Super League clubs remained in the competition. The decision was made to redraw and restructure the sixth round to comprise just two fixtures with only four teams, with the remaining six teams automatically receiving byes to the quarter finals.

The suspension of the competition also raised some uncertainty about the availability of Wembley as the venue for the final and it was not until 22 September that Wembley was re-confirmed as the venue for the final of the competition. It was hoped that spectators would be allowed into the final but on 28 September, the RFL confirmed that due to new COVID-19 restrictions being announced that the game will be played behind closed doors for the first time in the history of the competition.

Round details

First round
The draw for the first round was made at the home of community club Bentley, near Doncaster.  Ties were played over the weekend of 11–12 January 2020.

Second round
The draw for the 2nd round was made at the studios of BBC Radio Leeds and broadcast live on air. Ties were played over the weekend of 25–26 January 2020.

Third round
The draw for the third round was made live from Rochdale Hornets Crown Oil Arena. Ties were played on the weekend of the 8–9 February 2020. Several matches scheduled for 9 February were postponed due to the adverse weather caused by Storm Ciara and played the following weekend.

Fourth round
The draw for the fourth round was made live on BBC Sport, live from Halifax's MBI Shay Stadium. Ties were played over the weekend of 21–23 February 2020.

Fifth round
The draw for Round Five was streamed live on BBC Sport and Our League on Monday 24 February at 6.30pm live from Hull Kingston Rovers’ Hull College Craven Park. Rovers were one of four Super League clubs joining the competition at this stage, alongside Huddersfield Giants, Toronto Wolfpack and Wakefield Trinity. Ties were played over the weekend of 14–15 March 2020.

Sixth round
The draw for the sixth round was made live from MediaCityUK in Salford on Monday 16 March 2020, and was streamed live on BBC Sport, and the Our League app from 6:00pm. Originally scheduled to be made in New York, the draw was moved due to the COVID-19 pandemic.

Defending champions Warrington were due to start the defence of their title at this stage, along with other Super League teams Castleford, Catalans, Hull FC, Leeds, Salford, St Helens and Wigan. Ties were scheduled to be played over the weekend of 4–5 April 2020, however due to the suspension of all rugby league games as part of the United Kingdom's response to the coronavirus pandemic meant that these dates were speculative and therefore rescheduled for a later date.
The fixtures drawn on 16 March were:
Leeds Rhinos v  Hull Kingston Rovers
Newcastle Thunder v Toronto Wolfpack
Salford Red Devils v St Helens
Sheffield Eagles v Hull F.C.
Wakefield Trinity v Featherstone Rovers
Widnes Vikings v  Catalans Dragons
Wigan Warriors v Warrington Wolves
York City Knights v Castleford Tigers

On 17 July 2020, the RFL announced that the competition would resume on 22 August with a double header at the John Smith's Stadium, Huddersfield involving the Warrington v Wigan and Salford v St Helens with both games shown live on BBC TV. A few days later on 21 July Toronto Wolfpack announced that the club would be taking no further part in the Challenge Cup due to financial problems associated with the COVID-19 pandemic.

The RFL had also decided to abandon the Championship and League 1 competitions and following Toronto's withdrawal a meeting was held on 27 July to consider the future of the cup competition. The following day, the five non-Super League teams left in the cup; Featherstone Rovers, Newcastle Thunder, Sheffield Eagles, York City Knights, and Widnes Vikings, all announced that they were withdrawing from the competition. In response to this, the RFL announced that the whole of the sixth round was to be redrawn, involving just the 10 Super League sides remaining in the competition. Four teams would play in the revised sixth round, with the six remaining teams not to receive a tie for this round automatically gaining a bye to the quarter finals.

The redraw for the sixth round and the draw for the quarter-finals was made on 29 July. The two sixth round ties were due to be played as a double header at the John Smith's Stadium, Huddersfield as previously announced, with both ties being televised live on the BBC. During the week of 10 August, a number of Hull players and coaching staff tested positive for COVID-19, so the club's next fixtures, including the sixth round tie against Castleford were postponed.  The Castleford v Hull fixture was eventually played on 13 September.

Quarter-finals

Semi-finals
The draw for the semi-finals was made on 19 September with both games played at the Totally Wicked Stadium, St Helens as a double-header on 3 October. The draw was made live on BBC Two at the A J Bell stadium during the half-time interval of the last quarter-final match between Hull FC and Wigan.

Final

Broadcast matches

Notes

References

2020
2020 in English rugby league
2020 in Welsh rugby league
2020 in French rugby league
2020 in Scottish sport
2020 in Irish sport
2020 in Canadian rugby league